Adolf Marcus "Dolf" Joekes (5 May 1884 – 1 April 1962) was a Dutch politician and diplomat of the defunct Free-thinking Democratic League (VDB) and later co-founder of the Labour Party (PvdA) and businessman.

Joekes worked as a salesman for the Samarang–Joana Steam Tram Company and the Semarang-Cheribon Steam Tram Company in Batavia in the Dutch East Indies from 1910 until 1918 and a corporate director for the Dutch East Indies Railway Company from 1918 until 1920. Joekes worked as a civil servant for the Ministry of Labour as Director-General of the department for International Labour Laws, taking office on 18 May 1920. Joekes was elected as a Member of the House of Representatives after the election of 1925, taking office on 15 September 1925. Joekes also worked as a Managing editor of the party newspaper De Vrijzinnig-Democraat from 10 December 1925 until 1 May 1941. After the election of 1933 the Leader of the Free-thinking Democratic League and Parliamentary leader of the Free-thinking Democratic League in the House of Representatives Henri Marchant was appointed as Minister of Education, Arts and Sciences in the Cabinet Colijn II and selected Joekes as his successor as his Parliamentary leader in the House of Representatives, taking office on 1 June 1933. In May 1935 Henri Marchant announced he was stepping down as Leader of the Free-thinking Democratic League and Minister of Education, Arts and Science. Henri Marchant resigned as Leader and Minister on 18 May 1935 and was succeeded as Leader by Pieter Oud and that day Joekes was named as his Deputy. Following the election of 1937 Pieter Oud returned a Member of the House of Representatives but asked Joekes to remain as Parliamentary leader in the House of Representatives until 20 September 1937. In October 1938 Pieter Oud was nominated as Mayor of Rotterdam and he announced he was stepping down as Leader and Parliamentary leader and endorsed Joekes as his successor. Pieter Oud resigned as Leader and Parliamentary leader on 15 October 1938 with Joekes installed the same day. During World War II Joekes continued to serve as a Member of House of Representatives but in reality the political influence of the House of Representative was marginalized. Joekes also served as Chairman of the Free-thinking Democratic League from 9 May 1941 until 13 April 1943 following the death of Marcus Slingenberg. In May 1942 Joekes was arrested and detained in the ilag of Sint-Michielsgestel and was released in December 1942. In April 1943 Joekes was again arrested and was detained in the ilags of Scheveningen, Vught and Haaren. In August 1943 Joekes was transferred to the Buchenwald concentration camp and was detained until its liberation on 4 April 1945.

Following the end of World War II Queen Wilhelmina ordered a Recall of Parliament and Joekes remained in the House of Representatives. On 9 February 1946 the Free-thinking Democratic League (VDB), the Social Democratic Workers' Party (SDAP) and the Christian Democratic Union (CDU) choose to merge to form the Labour Party (PvdA). Joekes was one of the co-founders and became one of the unofficial Deputy Leaders of the Labour Party. For the elections of 1946 and 1948 Joekes was one of the Lijsttrekkers (top candidates) of the Labour Party. After the election of 1948 a cabinet formation resulted in a coalition agreement between the Labour Party, the Catholic People's Party (KVP), the Christian Historical Union (CHU) and the People's Party for Freedom and Democracy (VVD) which formed the Cabinet Drees–Van Schaik with Jokes appointed as Minister of Social Affairs, taking office on 7 August 1948. The Cabinet Drees–Van Schaik fell on 24 January 1951 and was replaced by the Cabinet Drees I with Joekes continuing as Minister of Social Affairs, taking office on 15 March 1951. On 15 September 1951 the Ministry of Social Affairs was renamed as the Ministry of Social Affairs and Health. Following the election of 1952 Joekes returned as a Member of the House of Representatives on 23 July 1952. Per his request Joekes was not considered for ministerial post in the new cabinet. The Cabinet Drees I was replaced by the Cabinet Drees I on 2 September 1952. In October 1952 Joekes was nominated as a Member of the Council of State, serving from 1 November 1952 until 1 June 1960.

Decorations

References

External links

  Mr.dr. A.M. (Dolf) Joekes Parlement & Politiek

 
 

 
 
 

 

 

1884 births
1962 deaths
Dutch anti-poverty advocates
Buchenwald concentration camp survivors
Commanders of the Order of Orange-Nassau
Dutch agnostics
Dutch corporate directors
Dutch expatriates in Indonesia
Dutch former Christians
Dutch magazine editors
Dutch members of the Dutch Reformed Church
Dutch people of World War II
Dutch political party founders
Dutch prisoners of war in World War II
Dutch resistance members
Free-thinking Democratic League politicians
Former Calvinist and Reformed Christians
Knights of the Order of the Netherlands Lion
Labour Party (Netherlands) politicians
Leaders of political parties in the Netherlands
Leiden University alumni
Ministers of Health of the Netherlands
Ministers of Social Affairs of the Netherlands
Members of the Council of State (Netherlands)
Members of the House of Representatives (Netherlands)
Municipal councillors of The Hague
Party chairs of the Netherlands
People from West Sumatra
Recipients of the Grand Cross of the Order of Leopold II
World War II civilian prisoners
World War II prisoners of war held by Germany
Writers from The Hague
20th-century Dutch businesspeople
20th-century Dutch civil servants
20th-century Dutch diplomats
20th-century Dutch jurists
20th-century Dutch male writers
20th-century Dutch politicians